Tibouchina catharinae is a species of flowering plant in the family Melastomataceae, native to Venezuela. It was first described by Henri François Pittier in 1947.

References

catharinae
Flora of Venezuela
Plants described in 1947